French in Action is a French language course, developed by Professor Pierre Capretz of Yale University. The course includes workbooks, textbooks, and a 52-episode television series.

The television series — the best-known aspect of the course — was produced in 1987 by WGBH, Yale University, and Wellesley College, and funded by Annenberg/CPB, and since then, has been aired frequently on PBS in the United States, developing a cult following for its romantic comedy segments interspersed among grammar and vocabulary lessons.

In 2010, Yale University hosted a 25th anniversary reunion in celebration of the programme's success.

Origins 
During the Second World War, Yale Professor Emeritus of Romance Languages Jean Boorsch, had produced for the American ASTP (Army Specialized Training Program) and the Navy V-12s (V-12 Navy College Training Program) an approach to oral French learning. He used a language immersion technique that he published in 1944 as the "Méthode Orale de Français". It had two main characters Mireille and Robert. Between 1960 and 1961, Boorsch and Capretz worked on an oral teaching method (never published) in which they retained the names of these two characters.

Capretz maintained these names in tribute to the "Method Boorsch" in each of the versions of his own "methods" before developing his French in Action course. He had the opportunity to progressively develop the characters themselves during this evolution.

Cast 

 Pierre J. Capretz - Narrator
 Valérie Allain - Mireille
 Charles Mayer - Robert
 Virginie Contesse - Marie-Laure
 Julie Arnold - Cécile
 Patrice Bachelot - Jean-Luc
 Franck de la Personne - Hubert
 Jean-Claude Cotillard - Mime/Homme en Noir
 Riton Liebman - Jean-Pierre Bourdon
 Mohamed Camara - Ousmane

Format 

Each episode is half an hour long. Early episodes have four main elements:
 a classroom session, featuring Capretz explaining the basic ideas of the episode to a group of international students
 an excerpt from an ongoing story, filmed especially for the series, and framed as a narrative that Capretz and his students are inventing in order to practice their French. The story focuses on American student Robert Taylor (Charles Mayer) and his French love interest Mireille Belleau (Valérie Allain).
 clips from French films and television shows, illustrating the new vocabulary words of the lesson
 a brief Guignol-style puppet show recapping some element of the episode's story (filmed at the Théâtre Vrai Guignolet at Champs-Élysées)

In later episodes the introductory classroom segment is omitted, and the episode begins immediately with an excerpt from the ongoing story.

The series uses context and repetition, rather than translation, to teach the meanings of words. With the exception of a brief English-language introduction at the beginning of each episode, the series is conducted entirely in French.

TV and movie clips 
Some of the sources for French TV and movie clips

TV shows 
 Merci Sylvestre
 Papa Poule
 Marie Pervenche
 Allo Beatrice
 Tout comme un homme
 Hélas Alice est lasse
 Le tueur est parmi nous
 Paris-Saint-Lazare
 L'héritage

Films 
 Le Maestro
 Le Cœur dans les nuages
 Le locataire d'en haut
 Connaissez-vous Maronne?
 La boucle d'oreille
 L'ennemi public
 Folie douce
 Une dernière fois Catherine
 Taxinoia
 Le passé à venir (Thierry Martenet)
 La France rêvée
 Visite au château (Jacques Deschamps)
 Ballades (Catherine Corsini)
 Voyage à Deauville (Jacques Duron)

Controversy
In 1990, three female students at Yale University filed a grievance claiming that the university's introductory French course was sexist in its use of the French in Action television series. In particular, the students objected to watching a scene in which the character Jean-Pierre harasses Mireille as she sits in a park and then being required to "pretend you were trying to pick up a pretty woman in a park". Some also objected to camera angles focusing on Mireille's legs, or breasts when she isn't wearing a bra.

Its creator, Capretz, a French native who has taught at Yale since 1956, said [he] "wouldn't change any of it". To teach French effectively, he said, "you have to make the students observe the language being used by native speakers, in real situations".

In response, the French department at Yale determined that the course would be changed by developing supplementary materials to be used in the course. However, the television programs themselves were not altered.

See also
Connect With English
Fokus Deutsch
Destinos

References

External links

Resources
 Watch all 52 French in Action videos online (US & Canada only)
  French in Action Fans Wiki (vocabulary and notes for half of the episodes)
 French in Action for Teachers (resources for teachers 2015-10-26)
French in Action for Teachers  (resources for teachers 2008-07-02)

Discussion
The French in Action Reunion - A 25th Anniversary Celebration
Valérie Allain and French in Action (comments section contains origins of Yale reunion with Charles Mayer) (fancyrobot.com archived by archive.org)
French in Action Fan blog
Fan interview with Professor Capretz
Yale French in Action Discussion LISTSERV (Archived 2000-10-11)
French in Action Discussion forum
Cool Tools review of series

French-language education television programming
Television series by the Annenberg Foundation
Television series by WGBH
French-American culture in Massachusetts
Wellesley College
Yale University
1987 American television series debuts